Fūka, Fuka or Fuuka (written: 風花, 風香) is a feminine Japanese given name. Notable people with the name include:

, Japanese child actress
, Japanese retired professional wrestler
, Japanese professional footballer
, Japanese actress
, Japanese women's footballer
, Japanese actress
, Japanese professional footballer

Fictional characters 
, a character in the final chapter of Suzuka, and the main heroine of Fuuka
, a character in the manga series Fuuka
, a character in the manga series Yotsuba&!
, a character in the tokusatsu television series Shuriken Sentai Ninninger
, a character in the light novel series The Pet Girl of Sakurasou
Fuka Kazamatsuri, a character in the video game Disgaea 4
, a character in the manga series Kodocha
, a character in the manga series Negima!
, a character in the anime series ViVid Strike!
, a character in the video game Shin Megami Tensei: Persona 3
Fuka, a character in the anime series Naruto Shippuden
Fuka, the default name of the main heroine in the video game OZMAFIA!!

Japanese feminine given names